Manaung Airport  is an airport in Manaung, Rakhine State, Myanmar. Manaung Airport was constructed in 1969 for Douglas C-47 Skytrain airplanes as a grass landing airstrip. In the 1983-1984 fiscal year, it was upgraded to be all-weather accessible with a 2,000 ft long bituminous airstrip for Twin Otter type aircraft. In 2015, The length of the airstrip was then expanded to 4,000 ft for F-27 Fokker aircraft, with only 3,700 ft of the airstrip being upgraded to asphalt concrete surface.

Airlines and destinations

References

Airports in Myanmar
Buildings and structures in Rakhine State
Airports established in 1969
1969 establishments in Burma